Mehmed Ali Pasha may refer to:

 Muhammad Ali Pasha (1769–1849), considered the founder of modern Egypt 
 Çerkes Mehmed Pasha (died 1625), Ottoman statesman and grand vizier
 Mehmed Emin Âli Pasha (1815–1871), Ottoman statesman and grand vizier
 Mehmed Ali Pasha (marshal) (1827–1878), Prussian-born Ottoman soldier

See also
 Mehmed Ali, a Turkish given name 
 Mehmed, a form of the Arabic name Muhammad 
 Ali (name)
 Pasha, a higher rank in the Ottoman political and military system